The 1966 Waterford Senior Hurling Championship was the 66th staging of the Waterford Senior Hurling Championship since its establishment by the Waterford County Board in 1897.

Mount Sion were the defending champions.

On 13 November 1966, Ballygunner won the championship after a 2-06 to 2-03 defeat of Mount Sion in the final. This was their first ever championship title.

References

Waterford Senior Hurling Championship
Waterford Senior Hurling Championship